The Polatlı–Konya high-speed railway is a  long high-speed railway running from the town of Polatlı to the central Anatolian city of Konya.

History
The railway is used by the Turkish State Railways' premier high-speed passenger service, Yüksek Hızlı Tren, which operates two routes on the line; Istanbul-Konya and Ankara-Konya. The railway was opened on 23 August 2011, making it the second high-speed railway in Turkey.

Construction of the railway started on 8 July 2006 and was finished in mid-2011 at a cost of TL1 billion ($330 million). On 3 June 2011, TCDD HT65001 Piri Reis made the inaugural test run with Prime Minister Recep Tayyip Erdoğan and Minister of Transport Binali Yıldırım; departing Ankara and arriving at Konya with large media fanfare. Test runs continued for two and a half months until the line was opened to commercial traffic on 23 August.

Gallery

See also
High-speed rail in Turkey

References

External links
Ankara Konya Hızlı Tren Saatleri

Transport in Ankara Province
Transport in Konya Province
High-speed railway lines in Turkey
Railway lines opened in 2011
Standard gauge railways in Turkey